Tolstovsky is a rural locality (a settlement) and the administrative center of Tolstovsky Selsoviet, Kamensky District, Altai Krai, Russia. The population was 615 as of 2013. There are 8 streets.

Geography 
Tolstovsky is located 33 km southwest of Kamen-na-Obi (the district's administrative centre) by road. Tambovsky is the nearest rural locality.

References 

Rural localities in Kamensky District, Altai Krai